The 2001–02 season was the 122nd season of competitive football by Rangers.

Overview
Rangers played a total of 59 competitive matches during the 2001–02 season. The side won both the Scottish League Cup and Scottish Cup in 2001–02, while finishing second in the Scottish Premier League.

The season started under the Management of Dutchman Dick Advocaat. Inconsistent form including two losses to Celtic meant that by December, Rangers were behind Celtic in the league.  Advocaat announced his resignation in December, moving to the position of Director of Football and Hibernian manager Alex McLeish took over. Rangers league form improved under McLeish with only one defeat taking place under him before the end of the season, but the gap opened up by Celtic meant no challenge to win the league was possible.

McLeish lead Rangers to success in the two domestic cup competitions.  In the League Cup semi-final Rangers beat Celtic 2-1 after extra time with a long range Bert Konterman goal proving to be the winner. They would then go on to win the competition with a 4–0 win over Ayr United in the final.  In the Scottish Cup Rangers against faced Celtic, this time in the final.  A dramatic last minute goal from Peter Løvenkrands saw Rangers win the game 3–2.

In Europe Rangers went out of the UEFA Champions League third qualifying round to Fenerbache and therefore dropped into the UEFA Cup. Rangers progressed in this competition and a penalty shoot-out win over PSG saw them stay in Europe beyond Christmas for the first time in nine years.  Rangers then narrowly lost the next round to eventual UEFA Cup winners Feyenoord.

Players

Squad information

Transfers

In

Total spending: £11.2m

Out

Total spending: £21.575m

Total loss/gain:  £10.375m

Player statistics

Goal scorers

Disciplinary record

Club

Board of directors

Coaching staff

Other staff

Matches

Scottish Premier League

UEFA Champions League

UEFA Cup

*Rangers won the match 4–3 on penalties

Scottish Cup

League Cup

Friendlies

Competitions

Overall

Scottish Premier League

Standings

Results summary

Results by round

References

Rangers F.C. seasons
Rangers